The 1998 Warsaw Cup by Heros was a women's tennis tournament played on outdoor clay courts at the Warszawianka Courts in Warsaw, Poland that was part of Tier III of the 1998 WTA Tour. The tournament was held from 13 July until 19 July 1998. First-seeded Conchita Martínez won the singles title and earned $27,000 first-prize money.

Finals

Singles

 Conchita Martínez defeated  Silvia Farina 6–0, 6–3
 It was Martínez's 3rd title of the year and the 36th of her career.

Doubles

 Karina Habšudová /  Olga Lugina defeated  Liezel Horn /  Karin Kschwendt 7–6(7–2), 7–5
 It was Habšudová's 2nd title of the year and the 4th of her career. It was Lugina's only title of the year and the 2nd of her career.

External links
 ITF tournament edition details
 Tournament draws

Warsaw Cup by Heros
Warsaw Open
War